TACC may refer to:

 The 618th Air and Space Operations Center (Tanker Airlift Control Center), 618th AOC (TACC), a United States Air Force unit
 Texas Advanced Computing Center, a research center at the University of Texas at Austin
 Territorial Approach to Climate Change, a programme undertaken by the United Nations
 Territorial Army Commissioning Course, a three-week course run at the Royal Military Academy Sandhurst for officer cadets commissioning into the UK Army Reserve (formerly the Territorial Army)
 Tetraammine copper chlorate a colouring for fireworks
 Traffic Aware Cruise Control, an alternative name for Adaptive cruise control
 Turkish American Community Center, a non-profit organization in the Washington metropolitan area

See also
 TASS, a Russian news agency